BVA may refer to :

 Bahujan Vikas Aghadi, a political party in Palghar District of Maharashtra state of India
 The IATA-Code of Beauvais-Tillé Airport, a small airport serving the city of Beauvais, France
Blinded Veterans Association, a U.S.-based organization established to help military veterans "meet and overcome the challenges of blindness"
 Board of Veterans' Appeals, a U.S. government tribunal established to decide cases regarding benefits claimed by military veterans
 Bond Volunteer Aspirants, a training and evaluation period for selection in the elite American drill unit The Summerall Guards
 Boundary Value Analysis in computer software testing
 British Valve Association, a defunct trade body in the United Kingdom
 British Veterinary Association, the national body for vets in the United Kingdom
 British Video Association, a trade body in the United Kingdom
 Federal Office of Administration (Bundesverwaltungsamt) in Germany
 BVA, Australian Hip Hop MC and member of Mnemonic Ascent
 Brooklyn Visions Academy, a fictional high school appearing in Marvel comics
 Bridging Visa A (BVA) is a temporary travel visa to Australia